Marignier is a commune in the Haute-Savoie department in the Auvergne-Rhône-Alpes region in south-eastern France.

Population

Transport 
The commune has a railway station, on the La Roche-sur-Foron–Saint-Gervais-les-Bains-Le Fayet line.

See also
Communes of the Haute-Savoie department

References

Communes of Haute-Savoie